Vanna Thamizh Paatu is a 2000 Indian Tamil-language romantic drama film directed by P. Vasu. The film stars Prabhu, débutantes Vaijayanthi and Mani Chandana. It was released on 17 November 2000. The film received mixed reviews.

Plot

Bhuvana (Vaijayanthi) is back to her village after dropping out of college. Her father Muthumanikkam (Radha Ravi), the village's Zamindar, is amazed when he listens to the song of Bhoopathy (Prabhu) and he hires Bhoopathy as a servant and singer in his house.

Muthumanikkam and his brother-in-law Rasappan (Anandaraj) are against love marriages. Thereafter, Devi (Mani Chandana), Bhuvana's sister, falls in love with Bhoopathy but Boopathy does not reciprocate it. Soon, Bhuvana's mother finds out about the marriage between Bhoopathy and her daughter Bhuvana.

A flashback is shown where Bhoopathy and Bhuvana fell in love with each other and were secretly married. Vijaya Raghunatha Bhoopathy Raja is, in fact, the son of the Zamindar Rathnavel Raghunatha Bhoopathy Raja (Prabhu). Rathnavel Raghunatha Bhoopathy Raja ordered them to first sought the blessings of Muthumanikkam and then he will bless them. Hence to win the heart of Muthumanikkam, Boopathy came as a servant to his home. Bhuvana's mother keeps the secret within her and does not inform Muthumanikkam.

Afterwards, Muthumanikkam finds out that Devi is in love with Boopathy and decides to send Boopathy out from his home. But Rasappan comes to rescue and informs the truth about Boopathy and Bhuvana. A small flashback is shown where Rasappan finds the real identity of Boopathy. Muthumanikkam understands the true love between Boopathy and Bhuvana and decides to agree to their wedding. Finally, Boopathy and Bhuvana are united with the blessings of both families.

Cast

Prabhu as Vijaya Raghunatha Bhoopathy Raja and Rathnavel Raghunatha Bhoopathy Raja
Vaijayanthi as Bhuvana
Mani Chandana as Devi
Vadivelu as Velu
Radha Ravi as Mukkalathur Muthumanikkam
Anandaraj as Rasappan, friend and brother -in-law of Muthumanikkam
Thyagu as Ponnusamy
Jyothi as Bhuvana's mother
Ravikumar as Police Inspector
Balu Anand as Velusamy
Besant Ravi
Bharathi as Meenakshi
Bhanusri as Velu's lover
Vishal as Venu
Veeramani
Raviraj as Arunagiri
Arunkumar as Jagan
Minnal Deepa as Bhuvana's friend

Production
The P.Vasu-Balu-Prabhu team comes together again ten years after they made 'Chinna Thambi'. The new film, 'Vanna Thamizh Paattu', is the eighth Vasu-Prabhu combination. Apart from wielding the megaphone, Vasu pens the story, screenplay and dialogues. The film is produced by K.Balu for Aishwaria Combines. The banner had earlier made 'Pandithurai', 'Uthamarasu', 'Paramparai' and of course the highly successful 'Chinna Thambi'. Shooting has been planned at exotic locations in Ooty, Mysore and Goa. Prabhu plays the dual role of father and son in the film. Two heroines are paired with him, both debutantes. One is Mani Chandhana and the other, Vyjayanthi. Anandraj, Radha Ravi, Bharati, Jyoti, Vadivelu, Thyagu, Bhanu and Ashwini form the supporting cast.

Vyjayanti had earlier worked under the stage name of Poonam in Tamil cinema. Despite working on Balasekaran's Solli Vidu and Thirunaal, her earlier films did not have a theatrical release.

Soundtrack

The film score and the soundtrack were composed by S. A. Rajkumar. The soundtrack, released in 2000, features 6 tracks with lyrics written by Vaali.

Reception
Cinema Today wrote "The story selected by P.Vasu is a well worn-out one. Hence monotony. The songs introduced as an element of difference have turned him upside down. prabhu and Vadivelu have emerged as his saviors." Lollu Express called it "Irritating and old story".

References

2000 films
2000s Tamil-language films
Indian romantic drama films
Films directed by P. Vasu
Films scored by S. A. Rajkumar
2000 romantic drama films